Enrique 'Kike' Tortosa García (born 13 July 1983 in Alzira, Valencia) is a Spanish former professional footballer who played as a right back.

External links

1983 births
Living people
Spanish footballers
Footballers from the Valencian Community
Association football defenders
Segunda División players
Segunda División B players
Tercera División players
UD Alzira footballers
Benidorm CF footballers
Albacete Balompié players
Burgos CF footballers
CD Guadalajara (Spain) footballers